The Diocese of Norwich is an ecclesiastical jurisdiction or diocese of the Church of England that forms part of the Province of Canterbury in England.

History
It traces its roots in an unbroken line to the diocese of the Bishop of the East Angles founded in 630. In common with many Anglo-Saxon bishoprics it moved, in this case to Elmham in 673. After the Norman invasion it moved to Thetford in 1070 finally moving to Norwich in 1094.

It covers 573 parishes with 656 churches covering all of the county of Norfolk save for the extreme west beyond the River Great Ouse that is part of the diocese of Ely. It includes the deanery of Lothingland (the port of Lowestoft and its immediate hinterland) in the county of Suffolk.

Like most older dioceses, the territory has been gradually reduced. Until the formation of the Diocese of St Edmundsbury and Ipswich in 1914, Suffolk was included, and earlier other areas.

Organisation

Bishops

The Bishop of Norwich (Graham Usher) leads the diocese and is assisted by two suffragan bishops, the Bishop of Thetford (Alan Winton) and the Bishop of Lynn (Jane Steen). The suffragan sees of Ipswich and of Thetford were both created by the Suffragan Bishops Act 1534 but went into abeyance after one incumbent; Thetford was next filled in 1894 and Ipswich in 1899. The See of Ipswich has been in abeyance since before the diocesan see including that city's name was created; a new second suffragan see – of Lynn – was therefore founded in 1963.

Alternative episcopal oversight (for parishes in the diocese which do not accept the ordination of women as priests) is provided by the provincial episcopal visitor, Norman Banks, Bishop suffragan of Richborough, who is licensed as an honorary assistant bishop of the diocese to facilitate his ministry. There are also seven retired bishops living in the diocese who are licensed as honorary assistant bishops:
2000–present: Malcolm Menin, retired Bishop suffragan of Knaresborough, lives in Lakenham.
2001–present: Richard Garrard, retired Director of the Anglican Centre in Rome & Archbishop's Representative to the Holy See and former Bishop of Penrith, lives in Upper Stoke and is also licensed in the Diocese in Europe.
2003–present: David Leake, retired Bishop of Argentina and former Presiding Bishop in the Southern Cone, lives in East Runton.
2004–present: Tony Foottit, retired Bishop suffragan of Lynn, lives in Reepham.
2006–present: Peter Fox, former Bishop of Port Moresby, Papua New Guinea is Vicar of the Lakenham Group.
2008–present: David Gillett, retired Bishop suffragan of Bolton, lives in Diss.
2009–present: Lindsay Urwin, Administrator of the Shrine of Our Lady of Walsingham, is a former area Bishop of Horsham. He is also licensed in Ely, Peterborough and Chichester dioceses.

Archdeaconries and deaneries 
The former deaneries of Ingworth and Sparham were combined in 2018. The deaneries of St Benet at Waxham and Tunstead were combined in 1996. The deanery of Hingham and Mitford was split between the deaneries of Dereham and Humbleyard in 1995.

*including Cathedral

**including Walsingham Shrine

Churches 
Last fully updated 9 October 2018.

Not in a deanery

Deanery of Norwich East

Deanery of Norwich North

Deanery of Norwich South

Deanery of Blofield

Deanery of Depwade

Deanery of Great Yarmouth

Deanery of Humbleyard

Deanery of Loddon

Deanery of Lothingland

Deanery of Redenhall

Deanery of St Benet at Waxham & Tunstead

Deanery of Thetford & Rockland

Deanery of Breckland

Deanery of Burnham & Walsingham

Deanery of Dereham in Mitford

Deanery of Heacham & Rising

Deanery of Holt

Deanery of Ingworth and Sparham

Deanery of Lynn

Deanery of Repps

Dedications 
This table is drawn from the above lists. More than half of the churches in the diocese have just four dedications: St Mary, St Andrew, All Saints and St Peter.

See also 

Norwich Cathedral

References

Church of England Statistics

External links

Churches in the Diocese of Norwich ("A Church Near You")

 
630 establishments
Norwich
Norwich
Religion in Norfolk
Norwich